Bison is a taxonomic group containing six species of large even-toed ungulates, among them the extant American bison and European bison (the wisent).

Bison or Bisons may also refer to:

Places in the United States
 Bison, Kansas, a city
 Bison, Oklahoma, an unincorporated community
 Bison, South Dakota, a town
 Bison, West Virginia, an unincorporated community
 Bison Township, Perkins County, South Dakota, a township

People

Surname
 Giuseppe Bernardino Bison (1762–1844), Italian painter

Nickname or stage name
 Béla I of Hungary (1016–1063), King of Hungary nicknamed "the Bison"
 Bison Dele (1969–2002, né Brian Carson Williams; presumed dead 2002), American professional basketball player
 Matt Kemp (born 1984), American baseball player nicknamed "The Bison"
 Bison Smith (1973–2011, né Mark Smith), American professional wrestler

Art, entertainment, and media

Fictional entities
 Bison (comics), a Marvel comic book supervillain
 Balrog (Street Fighter), known as Mike Bison or M. Bison in Japan, a character in Street Fighter series of video games by Capcom
 M. Bison, the main antagonist in Street Fighter franchise, known as Vega in Japan, designed by Akiman

Music
 Bison B.C., a heavy metal band from Vancouver, British Columbia, Canada
 Bison (indie folk band) from Chesapeake, Virginia
 "Bison" (song), by The Fireman

Other media
 Bison (novel), a 2014 novel by Patrick Grainville
 Bison (sculpture), a c. 1960 work by an unknown artist in Eugene, Oregon, US
 Bison (Siemering), a 1902 work by Rudolf Siemering in Berlin, Germany
 Bison Radio Network, which broadcasts North Dakota State Bison athletics

Businesses
 BISON, a collaboration between a group of computer companies (Bull, ICL, Siemens, Olivetti, and Nixdorf) that subsequently became X/Open
 Bison Transport, a Canadian transportation and warehousing 
 Bison Radio Network, which broadcasts North Dakota State Bison athletics
 Bison Company, Bison Life Motion Pictures, or Bison 101 Company, an early 20th century film studio that became part of Universal Studios
 The Bison industrialised building system is a precast concrete building system used in high rise flats, developed by Bison Manufacturing Ltd, Dartford, Kent which had been founded in 1919 to build military pill-boxes.

Military
 15 cm sIG 33 (Sf) auf Panzerkampfwagen I Ausf B, sometimes called the Sturmpanzer I Bison,  a German self-propelled heavy infantry gun of World War II
 15 cm sIG 33 auf Fahrgestell Panzerkampfwagen II (Sf), sometimes called the Sturmpanzer II Bison, a German self-propelled heavy infantry gun of World War II
 Avro Bison, a biplane spotter aircraft
 Bison (armoured personnel carrier), a Canadian fighting vehicle of the Mowag Piranha family
 Bison concrete armoured lorry, a British improvised mobile pillbox of 1940
 Mikoyan-Gurevich MiG-21 Bison, an upgrade variant of the MiG-21bis fighter jet for the Indian Air Force
 Myasishchev M-4, a Soviet Cold War-era strategic bomber, NATO reporting name Bison
 Operation Bison (Jammu & Kashmir 1948), an Indian Army assault in the Indo-Pakistani War of 1947
 Opération Bison, the French military operation in Chad in 1969–1972
 PP-19 Bizon or bison, a Russian submachine gun
 Bison, a French Guépard-class destroyer sunk in 1940 during the Norwegian campaign

Sports teams

Professional
 Basingstoke Bison, an ice hockey club from the United Kingdom
 Bisons de Neuilly-sur-Marne, a French ice hockey team based in Neuilly-sur-Marne
 Boulder Junior Bison, a junior A ice hockey team in Boulder County, Colorado
 Bristol Bisons RFC, an English rugby union team
 Buffalo Bisons (disambiguation), numerous Buffalo, New York, teams (baseball, basketball, football and hockey)
 Granby Bisons, a junior ice hockey team in Granby, Quebec, Canada, since renamed
 Kentucky Bisons, an American Basketball Association * Boulder Junior Bison, a junior A ice hockey team in Boulder County, Colorado
 Loimaa Bisons, a Finnish basketball team in Loimaa, Finland
 Okotoks Bisons, a junior B ice hockey team in Okotoks, Alberta, Canada
 Wainwright Bisons, a junior B ice hockey team in Wainwright, Alberta
 Bisons, a former name of the Mid-Missouri Mavericks, a defunct minor league baseball team

Collegiate
 Bucknell Bison, the NCAA Division I athletic teams of Bucknell University
 Howard Bison and Lady Bison, the NCAA Division I teams of Howard University, Washington, District of Columbia
 North Dakota State Bison, the NCAA Division I teams of North Dakota State University, Fargo, North Dakota
 Bison Sports Arena
 Bisons, the teams of Gallaudet University, District of * Howard Bison and Lady Bison, the NCAA Division I teams of Howard University, Washington, District of Columbia
 Bisons, the Division II teams of Harding University, Arkansas
 Bisons, the NCAA Division I teams of Lipscomb University, Nashville, Tennessee
 Bisons, the Division III teams of Nichols College, Dudley, Massachusetts
 Bisons, the NAIA teams of Oklahoma Baptist University, Shawnee, Oklahoma
 Manitoba Bisons, the athletic teams of the University of Manitoba, Canada

Technology
 GNU bison, a parser generator that is part of the GNU project
 Birmingham Solar Oscillations Network (BiSON)

Vehicles
 Chevrolet Bison, heavy duty trucks manufactured between 1977 and 1988
 Cosmos Bison, ultralight aircraft

See also
 Bizon (disambiguation)
 Bisone, a frazione of the Italian commune of Cisano Bergamasco